The 2023 Kebbi State gubernatorial election will take place on 18 March 2023, to elect the Governor of Kebbi State, concurrent with elections to the Kebbi State House of Assembly as well as twenty-seven other gubernatorial elections and elections to all other state houses of assembly. The election—which was postponed from its original 11 March date—will be held three weeks after the presidential election and National Assembly elections. Incumbent APC Governor Abubakar Atiku Bagudu is term-limited and cannot seek re-election to a third term.

Party primaries were scheduled for between 4 April and 9 June 2022 with the Peoples Democratic Party nominating former Army major general Aminu Bande on 25 May while the All Progressives Congress nominated teachers' union leader Nasir Idris on 26 May.

Electoral system
The Governor of Kebbi State is elected using a modified two-round system. To be elected in the first round, a candidate must receive the plurality of the vote and over 25% of the vote in at least two-thirds of state local government areas. If no candidate passes this threshold, a second round will be held between the top candidate and the next candidate to have received a plurality of votes in the highest number of local government areas.

Background
Kebbi State is a diverse, northwestern state with a growing economy but is facing rising insecurity and desertification. Politically, the 2019 elections confirmed the state's status as one of the most staunchly APC states in the nation as both Buhari and Atiku Bagudu won the state by wide margins and every single legislative seat on the senatorial, House of Representatives, and House of Assembly levels were carried by APC nominees.

At the beginning of his term, Atiku Bagudu said his administration would focus on economic diversification, further improving immunization levels, and infrastructure. In terms of his performance, Atiku Bagudu was commended for environmental protection and agricultural development but was criticized for new revelations to his previously-known looting of state funds during the Abacha administration involving his renewed attempts to retake some of the stolen funds that had been seized and his desperate attempts to keep hold of the loot still in his possession.

Primary elections
The primaries, along with any potential challenges to primary results, will take place between 4 April and 3 June 2022. An informal zoning gentlemen's agreement sets the Kebbi South Senatorial District to have the next governor as Kebbi South has never produced a governor. However, another interpretation of zoning based on the traditional emirates in the state would set up the Argungu, Yauri and Zuru emirates to produce the next governor as the largest Gwandu Emirate has held the office for much of the state's history. However, no major party has yet formally zoned their primaries.

All Progressives Congress 
Analysts view the APC gubernatorial primary as a likely battle between the preexisting major factions within the Kebbi State APC with one faction led by outgoing Governor Abubakar Atiku Bagudu and the other faction led by Kebbi Central Senator and former Governor Adamu Aliero. Aliero was reportedly backing the gubernatorial candidacy of Kebbi North Senator Yahaya Abubakar Abdullahi while conflicting reports stated that Atiku Bagudu was supporting Attorney-General Abubakar Malami or former Finance Commissioner Ibrahim Muhammad Augie; an added element of the party crisis is the supposed ambition of Atiku Bagudu to run against Aliero in the Kebbi Central senatorial primary. Tensions between the factions reached a head in late 2021 when Aliero's faction broke away and elected separate leadership to Atiku Bagudu's faction setting up a dispute over which was the legitimate party organization. As Atiku Bagudu is a serving governor, his faction was recognized by the national party in February 2022 but the internal rift has remained as questions of zoning and godfather support have continued. Further controversy arose when Malami officially announced his candidacy, firstly that Malami refused to resign as Attorney-General in accordance with the Electoral Act and secondly when photos emerged of over two hundred luxury cars Malami gave to delegates as bribes. However, when finally directed to resign by Buhari in May 2022, Malami instead dropped out of the gubernatorial race amid reports that he did not believe he could win the primary.

After Malami withdrew, union leader Nasir Idris was drafted in by allies of Atiku Bagudu to run as the governor's anointed candidate instead. On the primary date, the three candidates contested an indirect primary that ended with Idris emerging as the party gubernatorial nominee after results showed him winning just under 97% of the delegates' votes. In his acceptance speech, Idris thanked delegates and pledged to lead the state well while Abdullahi, who got zero votes, rejected the results as fabricated before defecting to the PDP a few weeks later.

Nominated 
 Nasir Idris: President of the Nigeria Union of Teachers and Vice National Chairman of the Nigeria Labour Congress
 Running mate—Abubakar Umar Argungu

Eliminated in primary 
 Yahaya Abubakar Abdullahi: Senator for Kebbi North (2015–present) and former Sokoto State Commissioner for Agriculture and Natural Resources (1990–1991) (defected after the primary to the PDP to run for re-election as senator for Kebbi North)
 Abubakar Gari Malam: former Customs service official

Withdrew 
 Abubakar Malami: Minister of Justice and Attorney General of the Federation (2015–present)
 Saliso Isa Nataro: 2019 NDP gubernatorial nominee

Declined 
 Samaila Yombe Dabai: Deputy Governor (2015–present)
 Ibrahim Mohammed Mera: 2019 APC gubernatorial candidate
 Ibrahim Muhammad Augie: former Commissioner for Finance
 Bala Ibn Na'allah: Senator for Kebbi South (2015–present) and former House of Representatives member for Fakai/Sakaba/Wasagu/Danko/Zuru (2003–2011)
 Hussaini Suleiman Kangiwa: former House of Representatives member for Arewa/Dandi
 Babale Umar Yauri: Secretary to the State Government

Results

People's Democratic Party 

In the five candidate primary, former Army major general Aminu Bande won by a substantial margin of about 51% of the votes cast. In his acceptance speech at the primary venue in Birnin Kebbi, Bande vowed to carry the party to victory and rehabilitate the state.

Nominated 
 Aminu Bande: former Army major general
 Running mate—Samaila Salihu Bui: House of Assembly member

Eliminated in primary 
 Ibrahim Abdullahi Manga: PDP Deputy National Publicity Secretary
 Buhari Bala: former Minister of State for Foreign Affairs
 Haruna Garba Argungu: energy manager
 Saidu Samaila Sambawa: former Minister of Sports and Social Development

Declined 
 Sarkin-Yaki Bello: 2015 PDP gubernatorial nominee
 Isa Mohammed Galaudu: 2019 PDP gubernatorial nominee and former Senator for Kebbi North (2011–2015)
 Umaru Tafidan Argungu: 2019 PDP gubernatorial candidate and former Senator for Kebbi North (2007–2011)

Results

Minor parties 

 Sani Abdullahi Mohammed (Accord)
Running mate: Aishatu Salihu
 Ahmadu Zumaru (Action Alliance)
Running mate: Bello Dan'Ate Abdullahi Argungu
 Garba Abubakar Zuru (Action Democratic Party)
Running mate: Umar Muhammed Dangara
 Saidu Abubakar (Action Peoples Party)
Running mate: Abubakar Miskiyu
 Zayanu Abubakar (African Democratic Congress)
Running mate: Abubakar Hassan
 Usman Aliyu Kaoje (Allied Peoples Movement)
Running mate: Fatima Mohhammed
 Umar Isah (Boot Party)
Running mate: Basiru Salai
 Gambo Tase Paul (Labour Party)
Running mate: Sani A. Habibu
 Manbo Bashri Susi Altine (National Rescue Movement)
Running mate: Isah Mohammed
 Abubakar Hudu-Idris (People's Redemption Party)
Running mate: Sani Daudu Tadurga
 Atiku Ahmed Maiahu (Social Democratic Party)
Running mate: Abubakar Umar Nafiu
 Sani Lami Muhammed (Young Progressives Party)
Running mate: Atiku Sahabi
 Magaji Suleman (Zenith Labour Party)
Running mate: Yahaya Hassan

Campaign
In the wake of the primaries, mass defections riddled both major parties as aggrieved APC members led by Adamu Aliero and Yahaya Abubakar Abdullahi decamped to the PDP while the APC also wooed defectors as a campaign tactic. The Aliero vs. Bagudu dispute that dominated Kebbi APC politics in the years prior to the primaries and into the gubernatorial general election campaign was compounded by the fact that Aliero and Bagudu were running against each other for the Kebbi Central senatorial seat. As the elections neared, campaigning intensified in December and January with Idris vowed to improve education and agriculture while Bande promised to combat banditry using his military experience.

By February, attention largely switched to the presidential election on 25 February. In the election, Kebbi State voted for Atiku Abubakar (PDP); Abubakar won 50.1% of the vote to defeat Bola Tinubu (APC) at 44.3%. Although the close result was unsurprising, the close margin and PDP win led to increased attention on the competitiveness of the gubernatorial race. Additionally, Bagudu lost to Aliero in the senatorial race and internal APC strife continued while the PDP grew from its federal election successes and zoning dynamics. The EiE-SBM forecast projected Bande to win while a Vanguard piece labeled the election as a "50-50" race.

Projections

Conduct

Electoral timetable

General election

By senatorial district 
The results of the election by senatorial district.

By federal constituency
The results of the election by federal constituency.

By local government area 
The results of the election by local government area.

See also 
 2023 Nigerian elections
 2023 Nigerian gubernatorial elections

Notes

References 

Kebbi State gubernatorial election
2023
2023 Kebbi State elections
Kebbi